Trife Diesel or Trife Da God (born Theo Bailey on July 11, 1980, in Stapleton, Staten Island, New York) is an affiliate of the Wu-Tang Clan. He is a protégé and close associate of Ghostface Killah and is part of both of his protégé groups T.M.F. and Theodore Unit.

He started his career on Shyheim's 1999 Manchild, and was featured in The Pretty Toney Album on the album's opener "Biscuits." A Theodore Unit album and mixtape followed. In November 2005 he released the album Put It On The Line with Ghostface, packaged with a DVD of Ghostface in concert. He has also appeared on the early 2006 Ghostface album Fishscale on the tracks "Be Easy", "Clipse of Doom", "Jellyfish", and "Dogs of War" as well as on "Miguel Sanchez", "Guns N' Razors", "Good", "Josephine (Remix)" and "Grew Up Hard" from Ghostface's late 2006 album More Fish.

He has in also recorded with many artists outside of Wu-Tang, such as Ali & Gipp, Bone Crusher, Saigon, Jae Millz, Tragedy Khadafi, Black Thought, Nate Dogg, Termanology, AC, and Tru Life. He was also featured on 'Ooh Wee', the lead-single from Mark Ronson's debut album, "Here Comes The Fuzz".

Discography

Solo albums
Better Late Than Never (2009)
 The Project Pope II (2018)

Collaborations
718 (2004) with Theodore Unit
Put It On The Line (2005) with Ghostface Killah
NY's Backbone (2006) with Theodore Unit (Mixtape)
 780 (2018) with DJ M80

External links

Interview with Trife Da God

1980 births
Living people
African-American male rappers
People from Staten Island
Rappers from New York City
Wu-Tang Clan affiliates
21st-century American rappers